Jeevamrutha is a natural liquid fertilizer. It is made by mixing water, dung (in the form of manure) and urine from cows with some mud from the same area as the manure will be applied in later. Food is then added to speed the growth of microbes: jaggery or flour can be used.

Jeevamrutha has been used by Indian farmers for centuries, falling out of use for some time before being revived in the 2000s.

Urine-based biopesticides
Urine-based biopesticides are a crude form of alcohol-based disinfectants widely used in killing some viruses/bacteria/germs in households, etc. Ethanol alcohol is generated from the cellulose and hemicellulose material present in the plant leaves by fermentation. Pretreatment of organic material with Urea or ammonia present (2 to 2.5% by wt) in the cattle or human urine, degenerates the fibrous lignin material present in the organic matter and facilitates the fermentation yeast to access/consume the cellulose and hemicellulose content in the plant-based organic matter. This pretreatment process is called slow Ammonia Fibre explosion. Generally, ethanol alcohol is produced from grains/fruits which are rich in starch/sucrose by yeast fermentation. With urine/ammonia pretreatment, cellulose and hemicellulose can also be converted into useful alcohols (ethanol and methanol) which can be used in pest control, disinfectants and for use as automobile fuel by blending with petrol after separating pure alcohol from fermented brew. Producing alcohol/biofuels from cellulose and hemicellulose is called second-generation biofuels. The alcohol content of the biopesticide can be enhanced by freezing the liquid, the solidified ice is removed and the remaining liquid is stored in sealed containers for a longer duration. The frozen ice can be used for room cooling.

Preparation
Any fresh leaves (preferably tender succulent plants, leaves, and shoots) are crushed into a paste and fresh urine is added in a 1:3 ratio (leaves:urine by weight). Urine with biomass is allowed to react slowly for 2 days until the active bubbling ceases. Wood-decay fungus is also added to the extent locally available to enhance alcohol yield. The treated urine with biomass loses its pungent smell as ammonia is absorbed by the biomass. Prepared baker's yeast preferably recombinant bakers yeast culture, by soaking dry yeast (1 to 2 gms) in sugar/jaggery mixed in water (100 ml for 10 liters of bio-pesticide) earlier, is added to the organic mixture. The mixture is allowed to ferment for two weeks duration and the solid sludge is separated and squeezed. Creatinine present in urine inhibits bacterial growth but permits yeast or fungus growth. The separated sludge can be used as organic fertilizer. The filtered liquid is used as a biopesticide to kill the eggs, larvae, and adult pests on the crops and trees. The prepared bio-pesticide will have around 10% alcohol by volume containing ethanol and methanol. The biopesticide is not edible and contains toxic methanol. It acts as poison if consumed by humans. The bio-pesticide can be stored for more than a year in a sealed container. The biopesticide does not have any pungent smell, unlike stored urine.

Aloe vera, cactus pear, madar, fresh tomato crop waste, fresh brinjal crop waste, creepers, and their leaves, Money plant, Water hyacinth, Pink Morning glory, water reeds, Prosopis juliflora leaves, congress grass, Cyperus rotundus, non-edible tubers, banana leaves, trunk & tubers, leaves and shoots of lotus and waste vegetables, are the few forms of green biomass which can be used for making bio-pesticide.

Effectiveness
As this biopesticide contains nearly 10% alcohols, while spraying on the crops, prior testing on few plants is to be done to observe any damaging effects such as leaf burning, drooping, wilting, etc. Accordingly, the concentration of the alcohol in the bio-pesticide shall be diluted by adding water. Alcohol-based pesticides do not leave any residue on the plants or soil and it gets washed off readily with rain/water. Bio-pesticide is also naturally degradable once its pest control purpose is achieved. When alcohol comes in touch with the eggs, larvae, insects, etc., it reacts with the skin and damages the tissue of the insects. Also, methanol present in the biopesticide acts as poison when consumed along with the plant mass by the insects. This biopesticide is effective on leaf-eating insects, sap-sucking insects, fungus, etc.

Advantages 
It can be made at a negligible cost with the plant leaves and urine available locally. Has no side effects on the soil and the produce. Farmers can also earn extra income by installing small production units to produce crude ethanol/methanol which would be sold to the nearby refining units to produce quality methanol/ethanol for blending in petrol/diesel.

Bio-urinals can be used in commercial complexes, residential apartments, etc. by installing urine-based biopesticide units. These units drastically cut the water consumption and load on the sewage system of cities and towns.

See also

 Cow urine
 Urease

References

Fertilizers
Agriculture in India
 
Biotechnology
Biological pest control